The West African Youth League (WAYL) was a political organisation founded by I. T. A. Wallace-Johnson in June 1935. The group was a major political force against the colonial government in West Africa, especially in the Gold Coast and Sierra Leone. The League was the first political movement in the region "to recruit women into the main membership and the decision-making bodies of the organisation".

In 1938 the popularity of the League increased in Sierra Leone as Wallace-Johnson returned. The league contested and won the Freetown City Council elections in the same year. At the time Wallace-Johnson claimed that the organisation had a membership of 40 000. Following the Freetown election victory, the British authorities arrested Wallace-Johnson. The league went into disarray after Wallace-Johnson was sent to prison on Sherbro Island in 1939. After attempting to revive the organisation in 1944, Wallace-Johnson took it into the Pan-African Federation set up in Manchester, United Kingdom. He decided to merge it into the National Council of Sierra Leone in 1950.

Mary Lokko served as Wallace-Johnson's assistant for a time beginning in 1936, becoming likely the first woman in West Africa to hold a position in a political organization.

Notes

References
 .
 .
 .
 .
 .
 .
 .

Anti-racist organizations in Africa
International political organizations
Civil liberties advocacy groups
Civil rights organizations
Politics of Sierra Leone
Politics of Ghana
Politics of West Africa
British West Africa
Youth organizations established in 1935
1935 establishments in Africa
1935 establishments in the British Empire